Mark Alford may refer to:

 Mark Alford (physicist), American theoretical physicist
 Mark Alford (politician) (born 1963), American politician from Missouri